The 2019 Herculis was the 33rd edition of the annual outdoor track and field meeting in Monaco. Held from 11–12 July at Stade Louis II, it was the ninth leg of the 2019 IAAF Diamond League – the highest level international track and field circuit. 15 events were contested with 13 of them being point-scoring Diamond League disciplines. Most events were held on 12 July, except for the women's triple jump, which was held on 11 July at Port Hercules.

In recognition of the recently deceased professional athlete Gabe Grunewald, who died a month earlier (11 June) after multiple battles with cancer and attempts to race through the disease, the meet organisers named the women's mile race the "Brave Like Gabe Mile". An elite field including world record holder in the 5 km, Sifan Hassan, and Diamond League leader in the 1500 m, Gudaf Tsegay, were invited. Hassan described the first 800 m as "a bit slow", but was able to run the last 800 m four seconds faster than the first to break a 23-year-old world record in the women's mile with a time 4:12.33. Hassan was recorded completing the first 1500 m in 3:55.30, a world leading time and faster than her Dutch record of 3:55.93. Every competitor in the race set either a personal best or a seasonal best, and national records were set by Gabriela DeBues-Stafford (4:17.87), Rababe Arafi (4:18.42), and Winnie Nanyondo (4:18.65) for Canada, Morocco, and Uganda respectively.

Also in the women's events, Sydney McLaughlin won the 400 m hurdles in a world leading time of 53.32.

On the men's side, Nijel Amos ran the first sub-1:42:00 time since he became the third-fastest competitor in the 800 m ever at the 2012 Olympic final, with a Herculis meeting record and 2019 world-leading time of 1:41.89. Only five people, including Amos himself, had ever run faster than 1:41.89. Piotr Lisek set a second personal best and Polish record in the span of a week with a meeting record and world-leading mark of 6.02 m in the pole vault, forcing European champion and world under-20 record holder Mondo Duplantis into second. Other highlights include Soufiane El Bakkali setting a world lead of 8:04.82 in the 3000 m steeplechase, and a meeting record in the triple jump by Christian Taylor with a leap of 17.82 m.

Diamond League results
Athletes competing in the Diamond League disciplines earned extra compensation and points which went towards qualifying for one of two Diamond League finals (either Zürich or Brussels depending on the discipline). First place earned 8 points, with each step down in place earning one less point than the previous, until no points are awarded in 9th place or lower.

Men

Women

Non-Diamond League results

See also
2019 Weltklasse Zürich (first half of the Diamond League final)
2019 Memorial Van Damme (second half of the Diamond League final)

References

Results
Results HERCULIS Meeting International d'Athlétisme EBS. IAAF Diamond League (2019-07-12). Retrieved 2020-03-30.

External links
Official Diamond League Herculis website

Herculis
Herculis
Herculis
2019 in Monégasque sport
July 2019 sports events in Europe